Law of the Mounted is a 1928 American silent Western film directed by J.P. McGowan and starring Bob Custer, Cliff Lyons and Mary Mayberry.

Synopsis
A Mountie officer on the trail of some fur thieves, discovers they are also tied up in a murder he is investigating.

Cast
 Bob Custer
 Cliff Lyons
 J.P. McGowan
 Mack V. Wright
 Bud Osborne
 Mary Mayberry
 Lynn Sanderson 
 Frank Ellis
 Sally Winters

References

Bibliography
 John J. McGowan. J.P. McGowan: Biography of a Hollywood Pioneer. McFarland, 2005.

External links
 

1928 films
1928 Western (genre) films
Films directed by J. P. McGowan
American black-and-white films
Silent American Western (genre) films
1920s English-language films
1920s American films
Royal Canadian Mounted Police in fiction
Northern (genre) films